is the railway station in Yoshii-chō Ōwatari, Sasebo, Nagasaki Prefecture. It is operated by Matsuura Railway and is on the Nishi-Kyūshū Line.

Lines
Matsuura Railway
Nishi-Kyūshū Line

Adjacent stations

Station layout
The station is ground level with 2 platforms and 2 tracks.

Environs
National Route 204
Shiwa Bank Yoshii Branch
Yoshii Post Office
Sasebo City Office Yoshii administration center

History
24 October 1933 - Opens for business as Yoshii Station.
1 April 1987 - Railways privatize and this station is inherited by JR Kyushu.
1 April 1988 - This station is inherited by Matsuura Railway and renamed to present name.

References
Nagasaki statistical yearbook (Nagasaki prefectural office statistics section,Japanese)

External links
Matsuura Railway (Japanese)

Railway stations in Japan opened in 1933
Railway stations in Nagasaki Prefecture